The 1970 Winter Universiade, the VI Winter Universiade, a international multi-sport event, organized for university athletes, took place in Rovaniemi, Finland.

Medal table

Participating nations

References

1970
U
Winter Universiade
Winter Universiade
Multi-sport events in Finland
Sports competitions in Rovaniemi
Winter Universiade
Winter sports competitions in Finland